Sir Richard Charles Hastings Eyre  (born 28 March 1943) is an English film, theatre, television and opera director.

Biography

Eyre was born in Barnstaple, Devon, England, the son of Richard Galfridus Hastings Giles Eyre and his wife, Minna Mary Jessica Royds.

He was educated at Sherborne School, an independent school for boys in the market town of Sherborne in northwest Dorset in southwest England, followed by Peterhouse at the University of Cambridge.

Eyre became the first president of Rose Bruford College in July 2010. He gives "President's Lectures" at this drama school; his 2012 talk was entitled "Directing Shakespeare for BBC Television". He lives in Brook Green, West London.

Theatre and opera
Eyre was Associate Director at the Royal Lyceum Theatre, Edinburgh from 1967 to 1972. He won STV Awards for the Best Production in Scotland in 1969, 1970 and 1971. He was artistic director of Nottingham Playhouse from 1973–78 where he commissioned and directed many new plays, including Trevor Griffiths' Comedians.

Eyre was artistic director of the UK's National Theatre (which gained the now little-used prefix Royal as outgoing director Peter Hall handed over to him) between 1987 and 1997. He had previously directed a well received revival of Guys and Dolls for the venue in 1982, with Olivier Award-winner Julia McKenzie and Bob Hoskins. He repeated this production in 1996 with Imelda Staunton and Joanna Riding. His diaries from his time at the National have been published as National Service, winning the 2003 Theatre Book Prize.

Other than Guys and Dolls, his theatre productions include Hamlet (twice), with Jonathan Pryce at the Royal Court in 1980 and Daniel Day-Lewis in 1989; Richard III with Ian McKellen; King Lear with Ian Holm; Tennessee Williams' The Night of the Iguana and Sweet Bird of Youth; Eduardo De Filippo's Napoli Milionaria and Le Grande Magia; Henrik Ibsen's John Gabriel Borkman with Paul Scofield, Vanessa Redgrave and Eileen Atkins; Ibsen's Hedda Gabler with Eve Best; and numerous new plays by David Hare, Tom Stoppard, Trevor Griffiths, Howard Brenton, Alan Bennett, Christopher Hampton and Nicholas Wright.

Eyre has also directed operas. His debut was the 1994 production of La traviata at the Royal Opera House which starred Angela Gheorghiu and was conducted by Sir Georg Solti. This production was televised and has subsequently been released on video and DVD.

He directed the musical Mary Poppins in London and on Broadway. On 14 February 2007, Eyre's production of Nicholas Wright's The Reporter premiered at the National Theatre, London. The play explores the social climate in the years before James Mossman's death as well as the reasons for the death itself.

Eyre directed a new production of Bizet's opera Carmen for the Metropolitan Opera's 2009–10 season, starring Latvian mezzo-soprano Elīna Garanča and Roberto Alagna. He returned to the Met for the 2013–14 season where he created and directed a new production of Jules Massenet's Werther with Jonas Kaufmann and Sophie Koch and returned to create and direct the 2014–15 season opening production, Mozart's The Marriage of Figaro.

Eyre was planning to direct Jon Robin Baitz's stage adaptation of Hollywood legend Robert Evans' memoirs The Kid Stays in the Picture and its sequel, The Fat Lady Sang, but the project was cancelled by the producer.

His production of Noël Coward's Private Lives starring Kim Cattrall and Paul Gross opened at the Music Box Theatre on Broadway in November 2011 following a run in Toronto. He directed The Dark Earth and The Light Sky for the Almeida Theatre, and The Pajama Game for the Chichester Festival Theatre.

Film and television
Eyre worked as both a director and one of the producers of BBC's Play for Today between 1978 and 1980.

He directed The Ploughman's Lunch (written by Ian McEwan) in 1983, which won the Evening Standard Award for Best Film, Iris, a biographical film of writer and philosopher Iris Murdoch (starring Judi Dench, Kate Winslet and Jim Broadbent), and Stage Beauty. Broadbent won the Academy Award for Best Supporting Actor for his performance in Iris, and Dench and Winslet were nominated for Best Actress and Best Supporting Actress, respectively.

He returned to the BBC in 1988 to direct the Falklands War story Tumbledown (starring Colin Firth), which won him the BAFTA Award for Best Director and the Prix Italia.

Eyre was appointed to the Board of Governors of the BBC in November 1995, and in October 2000 was appointed for a second term of office, though he resigned early (with effect from 31 May 2003) due to theatre and film directing commitments.

In 2006, he directed Notes on a Scandal, the film adaptation of the Man Booker Prize-nominated novel by Zoë Heller.

In 2008, he directed The Other Man, an adaptation of a short story by Bernhard Schlink, starring Liam Neeson, Antonio Banderas, and Laura Linney.

In 2012, he directed Henry IV, Part I and Part II as part of the BBC's The Hollow Crown series.

In the late 2010s, Eyre directed the drama film The Children Act (2017), based on the novel of the same name by Ian McEwan and starring Emma Thompson, and the BBC Two television film King Lear, which was broadcast on 28 May 2018.

In 2021, Eyre directed Allelujah, a film adaptation of Allan Bennet's play of the same name which starred Jennifer Saunders, Bally Gill, Russell Tovey, David Bradley, Derek Jacobi, and Judi Dench.

Writing
Eyre has written adaptations of Hedda Gabler and of Sartre's  (Dirty Hands) as The Novice for the Almeida Theatre.

A friend of Ian Charleson, whom he directed in acclaimed performances of Guys and Dolls and Hamlet, Eyre contributed a chapter to the 1990 book, For Ian Charleson: A Tribute.

Awards

He has been the recipient of numerous directing awards including five Olivier Awards. In 1982 he won the Evening Standard Award for Best Director, for Guys and Dolls, and in 1997 for King Lear and Tom Stoppard's The Invention of Love. In 1997 he won an Olivier Lifetime Achievement Award, and awards from The Directors' Guild of Great Britain, the South Bank Show, the Evening Standard and the Critics' Circle.

He was appointed a Commander of the Order of the British Empire (CBE) in the 1992 New Year Honours, and knighted in the 1997 New Year Honours, receiving the honour on 4 March 1997. He became a Patron of the Alzheimer's Research Trust in 2001.

In November 2013, he once again won the Evening Standard Award for Best Director for Ibsen's Ghosts at the Almeida Theatre. This production moved to the West End.

He was appointed Member of the Order of the Companions of Honour (CH) in the 2017 New Year Honours for services to drama.

Filmography

 The Cherry Orchard (1981)
 The Ploughman's Lunch (1983)
 Singleton's Pluck aka Laughterhouse (1984)
 Past Caring (TV - 1985)
 Loose Connections (1985)
 Tumbledown (BBC - 1988)
 Iris (2001)
 Stage Beauty (2004)
 Notes on a Scandal (2006)
 The Other Man (2008)
 The Dresser (BBC - 2015)
 The Children Act (2017)
 King Lear (TV - 2018)
 Allelujah (2022)

References

External links
 
 
 Eyre interviewed by Ginny Dougary (2002)

1943 births
Living people
Alumni of Peterhouse, Cambridge
BAFTA winners (people)
BBC Governors
BBC television producers
British opera directors
Commanders of the Order of the British Empire
English film directors
English theatre directors
English theatre managers and producers
Fellows of King's College London
Fellows of St Catherine's College, Oxford
Helpmann Award winners
Knights Bachelor
Laurence Olivier Award winners
Members of the Order of the Companions of Honour
Officiers of the Ordre des Arts et des Lettres
People associated with Rose Bruford College
People educated at Sherborne School
Mass media people from Barnstaple
Prix Italia winners
English republicans